St. Cloud or Saint Cloud may refer to:

Clodoald, known as Saint Cloud, a son of the Frankish king Chlodomer and a Catholic saint

Music
 Saint Cloud (album), a 2020 album by Waxahatchee

Places

Australia
St. Cloud, Burwood, an historic home in Sydney, New South Wales

France
Saint-Cloud, a town in Paris's western suburbs 
Château de Saint-Cloud, a royal château or palace near Saint-Cloud
Saint-Cloud Racecourse, a venue for horse racing in Saint-Cloud

United States
St. Cloud, Florida
St. Cloud, Minnesota
St. Cloud State University
St. Cloud, Missouri
St. Cloud, Ray County, Missouri
Saint Cloud, West Virginia
St. Cloud, Wisconsin

See also 
 Convention of Saint-Cloud, military convention of 1815
 Ordinances of Saint-Cloud, a series of July 1830 decrees by French King Charles X